Derek Rae (born 1967) is a Scottish association football commentator and presenter who currently works for ESPN and ABC in the United States for the English-language coverages of Bundesliga, DFB Pokal, and La Liga and Deutsche Fußball Liga for the English-language world feed. He is also an ambassador for Berwick Rangers.

Early life and education
Rae grew up in Aberdeen, Scotland. During his youth, he attended football matches with a tape recorder to work on his commentary. At the age of 15, he began his professional broadcasting career calling games for a radio station that broadcast to local hospitals. In 1986, BBC Radio Scotland announcer David Francey suffered a knee injury and Rae, a 19-year-old student at the University of Aberdeen who had sent the BBC a copy of his radio work, substituted for him on the commentary of a Scottish Premier Division game between Kilmarnock F.C. and Dumbarton F.C. The station was impressed and hired Rae to commentate on the Rous Cup match between rivals England and Scotland the following week. He remained with the BBC as its Scotland football correspondent, regularly commentating on Scottish Premier League and Scotland matches, a job he held for five years. Rae was the 1987 British Sports Broadcaster of the Year.

Career 
Rae moved to the United States in anticipation of the 1994 FIFA World Cup. FIFA hired him as a press officer and he oversaw the World Cup games that were held at Foxboro Stadium. Rae met his wife Beth Powers while working on World Cup preparations and the two would later settle in Beverly, Massachusetts.

Rae called Major League Soccer games for the New England Revolution from 1996 to 1999 and again in 2001, for the MetroStars in 2000 and the Los Angeles Galaxy in 1996.

After the World Cup, Rae joined ESPN International, where he called Eredivisie and Campeonato Brasileiro Série A games. His role later expanded to calling more than 150 games a year and hosting a weekly studio-based football discussion show, PressPass. He also writes a column called "Rae's Say" for ESPNsoccernet.

Rae is fluent in German and dabbles in several other languages. Rae has been known to call consulates to confirm that he has the correct pronunciation of a player's name.

In August 2009, Rae began splitting his time between the States and Scotland after being hired as lead commentator for Scottish Premier League matches on the UK version of ESPN.

In June 2010, he was in South Africa to commentate on 12 matches at the 2010 FIFA World Cup finals for ESPN USA partnered by Robbie Mustoe and Ally McCoist. In the summer of 2010 it was announced that Rae would be making the move back to the UK to continue commentating on a wider basis for ESPN's London-based channel.

In July 2013, Rae was confirmed as one of the lead voices on the new BT Sport channels. He commentated every week on the SPFL as well as the Europa League, Bundesliga and Ligue 1.

Rae served as a match commentator for ESPN USA's coverage of the 2014 FIFA World Cup finals in Brazil, and UEFA Euro 2016 in France.

In 2017 he announced that he was to leave BT Sport and would return to the states to work for ESPN. Rae also calls selected Premier League matches and has been a studio host for NBCSN. He will be calling Rugby Six nations games for them in 2018, having announced it on his Twitter feed on 29 January. In 2018, Rae became a commentator alongside Lee Dixon for FIFA 19'''s UEFA club tournament part of the game which can be found in Kick Off, tournaments and Career mode. This partnership continued in FIFA 20 with inclusion of him also commentating some 'default' games (kick off, tournament, career and Ultimate Team modes) alongside Lee Dixon once again, as well as in FIFA 21''.

Rae also worked as a commentator for the 2018 FIFA World Cup for Fox Sports in the U.S., calling group stage games from a Los Angeles studio with Aly Wagner as an analyst. The duo then flew to Russia as on site commentators for Morocco-Iran, Costa Rica-Serbia, Tunisia-England, Uruguay-Saudi Arabia, France-Peru, Nigeria-Iceland, England-Panama, Iran-Portugal, Iceland-Croatia, England-Belgium, Spain-Russia, Colombia-England and Sweden-England.

Rae broadcast his first MLS game for Fox on 2 March 2019 with a match between the LA Galaxy and the Chicago Fire at Dignity Health Sports Park with former MLS player Maurice Edu.

He forged an on air partnership in France with former US women's national team defender Danielle Slaton during the 2019 FIFA Women's World Cup again on Fox Sports. They were commentators for many high-profile matches including most of the France and Netherlands matches & ending with the Netherlands-Sweden semi final on 3 July 2019.

Rae worked as one of the many commentators for Amazon Prime Video's UK Premier League coverage working alongside Sue Smith. Rae can often be heard commentating for the world feed of the Bundesliga.

Since 2017, Rae has also teamed with Tommy Smyth to provide alternate British English coverage on the Amazon Video broadcast of Thursday Night Football in the US.

In 2020, Rae was named as ESPN's lead Bundesliga commentator as well as a contributor to ESPN FC, a columnist on ESPN.com, and a commentator for the English-language La Liga coverage on ESPN and ABC in the United States.

Television credits
FIFA World Cup: 1998 (ABC/ESPN), 2010 (ABC/ESPN), 2014 (ABC/ESPN), 2018 (Fox Sports), 2022 (Fox Sports)
UEFA Champions League: 2002-2009 (ESPN), 2013-2015 (ITV/STV), 2015-2017 (BT Sport)
UEFA Europa League: 2009-2013 (ESPN UK), 2013-2017 (BT Sport)
UEFA European Championship: 2008 (ABC/ESPN), 2012 (ABC/ESPN), 2016 (ABC/ESPN), 2021 (ABC/ESPN)
Scottish Premiership: 2009-2013 (ESPN UK), 2013-2017 (BT Sport)
Premier League: 2009-2013 (ESPN UK), 2017-present (NBC Sports), 2019–present (Amazon Prime Video)
FIFA Women's World Cup: 1999 (ABC/ESPN), 2019 (Fox Sports)
Bundesliga: 2009-2017 (ESPN UK/BT Sport), 2017–present (World Feed), 2020-present (ABC/ESPN)
DFB Pokal: 2021–present (ESPN)
FA Cup: 2009-2017 (ESPN UK/BT Sport)
La Liga: 2002–2009, 2021–present (ABC/ESPN)
MLS: 2019 (Fox Sports)
New England Revolution PxP: 1996–1999, 2001
LA Galaxy PxP: 1996
MetroStars PxP: 2000
Summer Olympics (Football): 2021 (NBC Sports)

References

1967 births
Living people
People from Aberdeen
Association football commentators
Scottish association football commentators
Alumni of the University of Aberdeen
British association football commentators
Scottish rugby union commentators
BT Sport presenters and reporters
People educated at Hazlehead Academy